Rodrigo Pérez may refer to:
 Rodrigo Pérez (footballer, born 1973), Chilean footballer
 Rodrigo Pérez (American football), Mexican gridiron football coach and former player
 Rodrigo Pérez (footballer, born 2003), Uruguayan footballer
 Rodrigo Pérez-Alonso González, Mexican politician
 Rodrigo Pérez de Traba, Galician medieval nobleman
 Rodrigo Pérez Mackenna, Chilean politician